Johannes Menke (born in 1972) is a German music theorist, University lecturer and composer.

Life 
Born in Nuremberg, Menke studied oboe, school music and German language and literature in Freiburg im Breisgau, then music theory with Eckehard Kiem and musical composition with Mathias Spahlinger. He received his doctorate in 2004 with a thesis on Giacinto Scelsi at the TU Berlin supervised by Janina Klassen.

From 1999 to 2009 Menke has taught music theory at the Hochschule für Musik Freiburg. Since 2007 he has been professor for historical composition at the Schola Cantorum Basiliensis.

Menke is editor of the series sinefonia (Wolke-Verlag), the series Praxis und Theorie des Partimentospiels (Florian Noetzel Verlag) and the magazine . He has published numerous publications on the analysis as well as the history and didactics of music theory, including two textbooks on counterpoint of the Renaissance and Baroque periods (Laaber-Verlag). Up to now he has composed mainly vocal and chamber music.

Publications  
 PAX : Analyse bei Giacinto Scelsi: "Tre canti sacri" und "Konx-Om-Pax".
 Kontrapunkt I: Die Musik der Renaissance. 
 Kontrapunkt II: die Musik des Barock.
 Schlüsselwerke der Musik.

References

External links 
Publikationen und Kompositionen von Johannes Menke on the Website of the 
 Interview in der Badischen Zeitung vom 26. Oktober 2012
 Publications by Johannes Menke on Academia.edu
 Website of the journal Musik & Ästhetik
 

German music theorists
21st-century classical composers
1972 births
Living people
Writers from Nuremberg